Artturi Aleksanteri Leinonen (15 December 1888, Ylihärmä – 26 February 1963) was a Finnish schoolteacher, journalist, writer and politician. He was a Member of the Parliament of Finland from 1936 to 1939 and again from 1944 to 1945, representing the Agrarian League.

References

1888 births
1963 deaths
People from Ylihärmä
People from Vaasa Province (Grand Duchy of Finland)
Centre Party (Finland) politicians
Members of the Parliament of Finland (1936–39)
Members of the Parliament of Finland (1939–45)
Finnish people of World War II
Finnish writers
Writers from South Ostrobothnia
20th-century Finnish journalists